The 1955–1956 Saint Louis Hawks season was the 10th season for the franchise. After 4 last-place seasons in Milwaukee, the Hawks relocated to St. Louis. The city had once been home to the St. Louis Bombers, an early BAA franchise that folded in 1950. The Hawks were on the verge of becoming one of the top teams in the NBA, led by second year forward Bob Pettit, who would earn the very first MVP award in NBA history. The Hawks would finish in third place with a 33–39 record.

In the playoffs against the Minneapolis Lakers, the Hawks were triumphant in Game 1 by a single point. Game 2 was played in Minneapolis, and the Hawks were blown out by 58 points in Game 2. The third game was contested in St. Louis. Once again, the Hawks would win by 1 point to advance to the Western Finals. In the three games, the Hawks were outscored by 56 points. In the Western Finals, the Hawks would win the first 2 games against the Fort Wayne Pistons. However, the Pistons would rebound to take the next 3 games and win the series.

Regular season

Season standings

Record vs. opponents

Game log

Playoffs

|- align="center" bgcolor="#ffcccc"
| 1
| March 16
| Minneapolis
| L 97–103
| Bob Pettit (22)
| Kiel Auditorium
| 0–1
|-

|- align="center" bgcolor="#ccffcc"
| 1
| March 17
| Minneapolis
| W 116–115
| Bob Pettit (25)
| Kiel Auditorium
| 1–0
|- align="center" bgcolor="#ffcccc"
| 2
| March 19
| @ Minneapolis
| L 75–133
| Bob Pettit (14)
| Minneapolis Auditorium
| 1–1
|- align="center" bgcolor="#ccffcc"
| 3
| March 21
| @ Minneapolis
| W 116–115
| Bob Pettit (41)
| Minneapolis Auditorium
| 2–1
|-

|- align="center" bgcolor="#ccffcc"
| 1
| March 22
| @ Fort Wayne
| W 86–85
| Al Ferrari (17)
| War Memorial Coliseum
| 1–0
|- align="center" bgcolor="#ccffcc"
| 2
| March 24
| Fort Wayne
| W 84–74
| Al Ferrari (21)
| Kiel Auditorium
| 2–0
|- align="center" bgcolor="#ffcccc"
| 3
| March 25
| @ Fort Wayne
| L 84–107
| Alex Hannum (18)
| War Memorial Coliseum
| 2–1
|- align="center" bgcolor="#ffcccc"
| 4
| March 27
| Fort Wayne
| L 84–93
| Jack Coleman (19)
| Kiel Auditorium
| 2–2
|- align="center" bgcolor="#ffcccc"
| 5
| March 29
| @ Fort Wayne
| L 97–102
| Jack Coleman (20)
| War Memorial Coliseum
| 2–3
|-

Awards and honors
Bob Pettit, NBA Most Valuable Player Award
Bob Pettit, All-NBA First Team

References

Hawks on Basketball Reference

Atlanta Hawks seasons
St. Louis
St. Louis Hawks
St. Louis Hawks